Piqua (pronounced locally as "PICK-way") is an unincorporated village in Robertson County, Kentucky, United States.  It lies along Routes 165 and 617 south of the city of Mount Olivet, the county seat of Robertson County.  Its name refers to the Piqua tribe of the Shawnee Indians which were indigenous to the region which became Kentucky.  Its elevation is 705 feet (215 m).  Johnson Creek, a tributary of the Licking River, flows through the community.

References

Unincorporated communities in Robertson County, Kentucky
Unincorporated communities in Kentucky